Matías Quagliotti (born 17 August 1985 in Trinidad) is a Uruguayan footballer who most recently played for Montevideo Wanderers in the Uruguayan Primera División.

External links
 
 

1985 births
Living people
People from Trinidad, Uruguay
Uruguayan footballers
Association football midfielders
Uruguayan Primera División players
Venezuelan Primera División players
Montevideo Wanderers F.C. players
Racing Club de Montevideo players
Deportivo Táchira F.C. players
Uruguayan expatriate sportspeople in Venezuela
Expatriate footballers in Venezuela
Association football defenders